Ram Behari Arora (1917–1997) was an Indian pharmacologist, medical academic, and the founding head of the department of pharmacology at Sawai ManSingh Medical College, the first medical college in the Indian state of Rajasthan. He was one of the founder fellows of the National Academy of Medical Sciences.

Born on 31 March 1917, Arora was known for his contributions to the field of cardiovascular pharmacotherapeutics. He researched traditional Indian medicine and published several medical papers on the subject; his articles have been cited by many authors. The Council of Scientific and Industrial Research, the apex agency of the Government of India for scientific research, awarded him the Shanti Swarup Bhatnagar Prize for Science and Technology, one of the highest Indian science awards for his contributions to Medical Sciences in 1961, making him the first physician to receive the honor.

Selected bibliography

Notes

References

External links 
 

Recipients of the Shanti Swarup Bhatnagar Award in Medical Science
1917 births
Indian medical writers
20th-century Indian medical doctors
Indian pharmacologists
Medical doctors from Rajasthan
Fellows of the National Academy of Medical Sciences
Year of death uncertain
Year of death missing